Taxeotis is a genus of moths in the family Geometridae described by Edward Guest in 1887. All the species in this genus are found in Australia.

Species
Taxeotis acrothecta Turner, 1904
Taxeotis adelia Prout, 1910
Taxeotis adelpha Turner, 1904
Taxeotis aenigmatodes Turner, 1929
Taxeotis alloceros Turner, 1929
Taxeotis anthracopa Meyrick, 1890
Taxeotis bigeminata L. B. Prout, 1910
Taxeotis blechra Turner, 1929
Taxeotis celidora Turner, 1939
Taxeotis compar Turner, 1929
Taxeotis didymosticha Turner, 1939
Taxeotis egenata (Walker, 1861)
Taxeotis endela Meyrick, 1890
Taxeotis epigaea Turner, 1904
Taxeotis epigypsa Meyrick, 1890
Taxeotis eremophila Turner, 1929
Taxeotis euryzona Turner, 1936
Taxeotis eutyctodes Turner, 1939
Taxeotis exaereta Turner, 1929
Taxeotis exsectaria (Walker, 1861)
Taxeotis goniogramma Meyrick, 1897
Taxeotis helicta Turner, 1939
Taxeotis holoscia Lower, 1903
Taxeotis homoeopa Turner, 1944
Taxeotis intermixtaria (Walker, 1861)
Taxeotis intextata (Guenée, 1857)
Taxeotis isomeris Meyrick, 1890
Taxeotis lechrioschema Turner, 1939
Taxeotis limbosa Turner, 1933
Taxeotis lygrophanes (Turner, 1943)
Taxeotis maerens (Turner, 1939)
Taxeotis mimela Prout, 1910
Taxeotis notosticta Turner, 1936
Taxeotis ochrosticta Turner, 1929
Taxeotis oraula Meyrick, 1890
Taxeotis orphnina Turner, 1904
Taxeotis perlinearia (Walker, 1861)
Taxeotis phaeopa Lower, 1899
Taxeotis philodora Meyrick, 1890
Taxeotis phricocyma Turner, 1929
Taxeotis pleurostigma Turner, 1943
Taxeotis pychnomochla Turner, 1939
Taxeotis reserata (Walker, 1860)
Taxeotis spodoides Turner, 1943
Taxeotis stereospila Meyrick, 1890
Taxeotis thegalea Turner, 1939
Taxeotis xanthogramma Lower, 1903

References

Oenochrominae